Lichomolgidae is a family of copepods belonging to the order Cyclopoida.

Genera

Genera:
 Ascidioxynus Humes & Stock, 1972
 Astericola Rosoll, 1888
 Boholia Kossmann, 1872

References

Copepods